Phạm Thị Huệ (born 31 August 1973, in Cẩm Phả Town, Quảng Ninh Province) is a Vietnamese đàn bầu, đàn đáy, and đàn tỳ bà player, singer, composer and educator. She is the founder and owner of the Thăng Long Ca trù Theater in the Hanoi historic district and has become a leading exponent in the revival of ca trù singing throughout Vietnam.

Early life and education 
Phạm Thị Huệ was born in Cẩm Phả Town, Quảng Ninh Province, into an artistic family. She is the daughter of Bui Thi Que (mother) and Doan Van Huu (father) a painter and photographer. She has four sisters including Vi Thi Le (born 1986), a television reporter in Bắc Kạn Province; Doan Hoang Khanh Linh (born 1990), a pianist; and Doan Linh Huong (born in 1996), a graduate of the Vietnam National Academy of Music (previously known as the Hanoi Conservatory of Music), and a đàn đáy and đàn tỳ bà performer.

Huệ received her first musical training at the age of five from her father, a self-taught musician. She progressed rapidly in her studies and, at the age of six, was performing on the mandolin and singing at the Bai Chay Trade Union Guest House in Quảng Ninh Province. In 1981, at the age of eight, Huệ was admitted to Hanoi Music Academy where she studied đàn tỳ bà and in 1990, organized the "Trúc Xinh" (Pretty Bamboo) band with six of her classmates. A year later, she founded another ensemble named The White Tuberose Band.

From 1992 to 1997, Huệ studied traditional scales and melodic construction with the Vietnamese musicologist Bui Trong Hien. From 1993 to 1996 Huệ studied cải lương (reformed theater) with the blind guitarist, Kim Sinh Sinh. From 1995 to 1996, she studied composition with the Vietnamese modernist composer, Tran Trong Hung.

Career 
Following her graduation from the Hanoi Conservatory of Music, Huệ stayed on as a lecturer and instructor of the đàn tỳ bà in the traditional music department. In 1998 Huệ founded the Bac Ha band, while continuing a distinguished career as a traditional music soloist. In 2001, Huệ was selected to represent Vietnam in several cultural exchange programs, including a traditional music festival in Thailand and a cultural exchange program between the Malmö Academy of Music and the Vietnam National Academy of Music.

In addition to her teaching responsibilities, Huệ continued her studies of Vietnamese traditional music including nhã nhạc (refined court music from the royal city of Huế) and chầu văn (a genre of mediumship trance song) under the guidance of Kim Sinh and most significantly, studies in the art of ca trù performance with masters Nguyễn Thị Chúc and Nguyễn Phú Đẹ. Hue progressed rapidly in her studies and, in June 2006, she was initiated into the ca trù guild following her dedication in the "Mở xiêm y" ceremony (a traditional rite announcing the true beginning of a young songstress's occupation).

In August 2006, Huệ and her mentors established the Ca trù Thang Long Club in Hanoi. From 2006 to 2009, Huệ devoted most of her time to developing programs and curricula for the club and completing her Master's thesis, "The Đàn tỳ bà in Modern Vietnamese Society" (2007, unpublished) under Professor Trần Văn Khê. Following the completion of her Master's coursework, Huệ once again began participating in national and international arts and music festivals, including the first Cracking Bamboo Percussion Festival, performances in Australia and Korea, and being awarded the Gold Medal in October 2009 in Vietnam's National Festival of Ca trù, the same year that UNESCO added ca trù to the Urgent Safeguarding List of the Intangible Cultural Heritage of Humanity.

In 2011, Huệ released her first CD, Ca trù Singing House featuring Huệ on vocals accompanied by Master Nguyễn Phú Đẹ on the đàn đáy.

In addition to her activities as a teacher, performer, and managing director of the Ca trù Thang Long Club, Huệ has written numerous articles including "Oral Transmission" (2005), "The Vietnamese Đàn tỳ bà and the Korean Bipa" (2005), "A Proposal for Teaching Traditional Vietnamese Musical Instruments in Schools" (2012), "Locating Traditional Musical Instruments and Theater Arts in Contemporary Society" (2012), and "Developing and Popularizing Traditional Musical Heritage for International Tourists" (2012).

Ca trù Thang Long Club 
With the creation of the Ca trù Thang Long Club (located at 87 Ma May, Hoàn Kiếm, in Hanoi's historic district), Huệ was able to develop a platform dedicated to the preservation and presentation of ca trù in an authentic setting. In addition to offering performances three times a week, Huệ has recruited a number of young acolytes to continue the tradition of ca trù. Her work with the younger generation has earned her widespread recognition from her peers, including ethnomusicologist Bui Trong Hien, folk arts expert To Ngoc Thanh Thanh, Trần Văn Khê and UNESCO.

Compositions 
 "Ảo vọng" (Illusion) – for tỳ bà and string quartet (1996)
 "Đường về quê mẹ" (The way back to mother's homeland) – for tỳ bà and percussion (1997)
 "Thục nữ du xuân I" (Virtuous woman enjoys the spring I) – for tỳ bà and percussion (1997)
 "Kỷ niệm mùa thu" (Commemoration of Spring) – for tỳ bà and wind instruments (2002) – (premiered in Sweden)
 "Hạt nắng" (Drop of sunshine) – tỳ bà solo (2005)
 "Thục nữ du xuân II" (Virtuous woman enjoys the spring II) – đàn đáy and phách woodblocks (2007)
 "Khúc ca trù Thăng Long" (Thang Long festival song) – voice and traditional instrumental ensemble (2008)
 "Kiều khúc" (Pretty song) – đàn đáy and voice (2012)

Hue has also composed many folk songs and written original music for use by her students.

References 

1973 births
Living people
Vietnamese composers
21st-century Vietnamese women singers
People from Quảng Ninh province